Maxine Martell (born 1937) is an American artist. Her work is included in the collections of the Smithsonian American Art Museum, the Henry Art Gallery, Seattle and the Northwest Museum of Arts and Culture.

References

1937 births
Artists from Oklahoma
20th-century American women artists
21st-century American women artists
20th-century American printmakers
21st-century American printmakers
Living people